This is a list of notable individuals of Jamaican Maroon ancestry.

A
Yvonne Aki-Sawyerr, current mayor of Freetown

C
Adelaide Casely-Hayford, activist, nationalist and fiction writer
Gladys Casely-Hayford, first author to write in the Krio language

D
Doris Darlington, one of Jamaica's first sound system operators, and a force in the development of ska, rocksteady and reggae music

E
Macormack Charles Farrell Easmon, medical doctor

H
Thomas Frederick Hope, engineer and entrepreneur

J
Colin Jackson, former sprint and hurdling athlete who specialised in the 110 metres hurdles
Albert Jarrett, footballer who last played for Dulwich Hamlet and has represented the Sierra Leone national football team
Constance Agatha Cummings-John, first woman to serve as mayor of Freetown
 Eldred Durosimi Jones, academic and literary critic

M
Timothy E. McPherson Jr., Jamaican economist

P
Suzanne Packer, actress known for playing the role of Tess Bateman in the BBC medical drama Casualty
Arthur Thomas Porter, academic and historian

R 
Namba Roy, artist, from Accompong
Jesse Royal, musician, singer and songwriter

S
Daddy Saj, afropop musician
Kathleen Mary Easmon Simango, artist and missionary
 Robert Smith, assistant colonial surgeon
Francis Smith, puisne judge

References 

Jamaican Maroons 
Jamaican Maroons